The Hindu Mandir of Lake County (HMLC''') is a non-profit Hindu temple situated in Grayslake, Illinois. The Hindu Mandir of Lake County was originally established in 2004.

Major festivals and events
Several festivals are celebrated at the temple each year. The major recurring events celebrated are:

 Maha Shivaratri in Feb-March.
 Holi in Feb-Mar.
 Rama Navami in April.
 Krishna Janmashtami in Aug-Sep.
 Dussera culminating in Vijayadashami in Sep-Oct.
 Diwali in Oct-Nov.
 Akhand Ramayan in Dec 31-Jan 1

The recurring monthly events are:
 Lord Ayappa Puja                                         on the 1st Saturday, 4-6 PM
 Satyanarayan Puja                          every Poornima (Full moon day), 6:30-8 PM
 Mata Ki Chowki                                        on the 2nd Saturday, 5:30-8 PM
 Venkateshwara Abishekam                                 on the 3rd Saturday, 9-11 AM
 Navagraha Puja                                        on the 4th Saturday, 5:30-8 PM
 Sunderkand Paath                                        on the 4th Sunday, 4-6:30 PM
 Pradosham                                         (Dates vary, check online calendar)
 Shukla Shashthi Puja                              (Dates vary, check online calendar)
 Sankashti Chaturthi (Sankat Haran Chaturthi) Puja (Dates vary, check online calendar)

The recurring weekly events are:
 Ganesha Puja, every Sunday at 6:30 PM
 Shiva Puja, every Monday at 6:30 PM
 Rama and Hanuman Puja, every Tuesday at 6:30 PM
 Krishna Puja, every Wednesday at 6:30 PM
 Sarva Deva Puja, every Thursday at 6:30 PM
 Devi Puja, every Friday at 6:30 PM

Facility
The Mandir's worship hall is located on the upper floor of the building; while the kitchen, gift shop, and auditorium are located on the lower floor.

Activities
Activities (depending on time and date) typically include:
 Yoga classes every Sunday at 8:30 AM
 Cultural activities during many major festivals

Membership
Categories of memberships:
 Regular Member
 Life Member
 Patron Member

References

External links
 The Hindu Mandir of Lake County Homepage

Hindu temples in Illinois
Tourist attractions in Lake County, Illinois